Piacenza Calcio had the highest-scoring season in the club's history, but in spite of this, a defeat to Verona in the final round would have rendered relegation. Two goals from Dario Hübner helped sealing a 3–0 victory, which propelled Hübner to become top scorer of the entire Serie A, tying for 24 goals with David Trezeguet. The ex-Brescia hitman Hübner came following the promotion, and aged 34, he reached the very top of his level.

The season also saw the first three foreign players arrive at Piacenza. Brazilians Matuzalém and Amauri were the most prominent of those.

Squad

Goalkeepers
  Matteo Guardalben
  Paolo Orlandoni
  Cristiano Scalabrelli

Defenders
  Nicola Boselli
  Giuseppe Cardone
  Filippo Cristante
  Gianluca Lamacchi
  Alessandro Lucarelli
  Roberto Maltagliati
  Nicola Mora
  Stefano Sacchetti
  Vittorio Tosto

Midfielders
  Gabriele Ambrosetti
  Eusebio Di Francesco
  Matuzalém
  Salvatore Miceli
  Bogdan Pătraşcu
  Vincenzo Sommense
  Francesco Statuto
  Sergio Volpi
  Paolo Tramezzani

Attackers
  Dario Hübner
  Nicola Caccia
  Amauri
  Paolo Poggi
  Massimo Rastelli
  Daniele Cacia
  Francesco Palmieri
  Francesco Zerbini

Serie A

Matches

Top Scorers
  Dario Hübner 24 (6)
  Carmine Gautieri 7
  Eusebio Di Francesco 6
  Matuzalém 3
  Paolo Poggi 3

Sources
  RSSSF - Italy 2001/02

Piacenza Calcio 1919 seasons
Piacenza